The term friction loss (or frictional loss) has a number of different meanings, depending on its context.  

 In fluid flow it is the head loss that occurs in a containment such as a pipe or duct due to the effect of the fluid's viscosity near the surface of the containment.

 In mechanical systems such as internal combustion engines, the term refers to the power lost in overcoming the friction between two moving surfaces.

 In economics, frictional loss is natural and irrecoverable loss in a transaction or the cost(s) of doing business too small to account for.  Contrast with tret in shipping, which made a general allowance for otherwise unaccounted for factors.

Engineering
Friction loss is a significant engineering concern wherever fluids are made to flow, whether entirely enclosed in a pipe or duct, or with a surface open to the air.
 Historically, it is a concern in aqueducts of all kinds, throughout human history. It is also relevant to sewer lines. Systematic study traces back to Henry Darcy, an aqueduct engineer. 
 Natural flows in river beds are important to human activity; friction loss in a stream bed has an effect on the height of the flow, particularly significant during flooding. 
 The economies of pipelines for petrochemical delivery are highly affected by friction loss. The Yamal–Europe pipeline carries methane at a volume flow rate of 32.3 × 109 m3 of gas per year, at Reynolds numbers greater than 50 × 106.
 In hydropower applications, the energy lost to skin friction in flume and penstock is not available for useful work, say generating electricity. 
 In refrigeration applications, energy is expended pumping the coolant fluid through pipes or through the condenser. In split systems, the pipes carrying the coolant take the place of the air ducts in HVAC systems.

Calculating volumetric flow
In the following discussion, we define volumetric flow rate V̇ (i.e. volume of fluid flowing per time) as 

where
 r = radius of the pipe (for a pipe of circular section, the internal radius of the pipe).
 v = mean velocity of fluid flowing through the pipe.
 A = cross sectional area of the pipe.
In long pipes, the loss in pressure (assuming the pipe is level) is proportional to the length of pipe involved.
Friction loss is then the change in pressure Δp per unit length of pipe L

When the pressure is expressed in terms of the equivalent height of a column of that fluid, as is common with water, the friction loss is expressed as S, the "head loss" per length of pipe, a dimensionless quantity also known as the hydraulic slope. 
 
where
 ρ = density of the fluid, (SI kg / m3)
 g = the local acceleration due to gravity;

Characterizing friction loss 

Friction loss, which is due to the shear stress between the pipe surface and the fluid flowing within, depends on the conditions of flow and the physical properties of the system. These conditions can be encapsulated into a dimensionless number Re, known as the Reynolds number

where V is the mean fluid velocity and D the diameter of the (cylindrical) pipe.  In this expression, the properties of the fluid itself are reduced to the kinematic viscosity ν

where
 μ = viscosity of the fluid (SI kg / m • s)

Friction loss in straight pipe 
The friction loss in uniform, straight sections of pipe, known as "major loss", is caused by the effects of viscosity, the movement of fluid molecules against each other or against the (possibly rough) wall of the pipe. Here, it is greatly affected by whether the flow is laminar (Re < 2000) or turbulent (Re > 4000):
 In laminar flow, losses are proportional to fluid velocity, V; that velocity varies smoothly between the bulk of the fluid and the pipe surface, where it is zero. The roughness of the pipe surface influences neither the fluid flow nor the friction loss. 
 In turbulent flow, losses are proportional to the square of the fluid velocity, V2;  here, a layer of chaotic eddies and vortices near the pipe surface, called the viscous sub-layer, forms the transition to the bulk flow. In this domain, the effects of the roughness of the pipe surface must be considered. It is useful to characterize that roughness as the ratio of the roughness height ε to the pipe diameter D, the "relative roughness".  Three sub-domains pertain to turbulent flow:
 In the smooth pipe domain, friction loss is relatively insensitive to roughness. 
 In the rough pipe domain, friction loss is dominated by the relative roughness and is insensitive to Reynolds number.
 In the transition domain, friction loss is sensitive to both. 
 For Reynolds numbers 2000 < Re < 4000, the flow is unstable, varying with time as vortices within the flow form and vanish randomly. This domain of flow is not well modeled, nor are the details well understood.

For friction 
Factors other than straight pipe flow induce friction loss; these are known as “minor loss”:
 Fittings, such as bends, couplings, valves, or transitions in hose or pipe diameter, or
 Objects intruded into the fluid flow.
For the purposes of calculating the total friction loss of a system, the sources of form friction are sometimes reduced to an equivalent length of pipe.

Surface roughness 
The roughness of the surface of the pipe or duct affects the fluid flow in the regime of turbulent flow. Usually denoted by ε, values used for calculations of water flow, for some representative materials are:

Values used in calculating friction loss in ducts (for, e.g., air) are:

Calculating friction loss

Hagen–Poiseuille 
Laminar flow is encountered in practice with very viscous fluids, such as motor oil, flowing through small-diameter tubes, at low velocity. Friction loss under conditions of laminar flow follow the Hagen–Poiseuille equation, which is an exact solution to the Navier-Stokes equations. For a circular pipe with a fluid of density ρ and viscosity μ, the hydraulic slope S can be expressed

In laminar flow (that is, with Re < ~2000), the hydraulic slope is proportional to the flow velocity.

Darcy–Weisbach 
In many practical engineering applications, the fluid flow is more rapid, therefore turbulent rather than laminar. Under turbulent flow, the friction loss is found to be roughly proportional to the square of the flow velocity and inversely proportional to the pipe diameter, that is, the friction loss follows the phenomenological Darcy–Weisbach equation in which the hydraulic slope S can be expressed
 
where we have introduced the Darcy friction factor fD (but see Confusion with the Fanning friction factor);
 fD = Darcy friction factor
Note that the value of this dimensionless factor depends on the pipe diameter D and the roughness of the pipe surface ε. Furthermore, it varies as well with the flow velocity V  and on the physical properties of the fluid (usually cast together into the Reynolds number Re). Thus, the friction loss is not precisely proportional to the flow velocity squared, nor to the inverse of the pipe diameter: the friction factor takes account of the remaining dependency on these parameters.

From experimental measurements, the general features of the variation of fD are, for fixed relative roughness ε / D and for Reynolds number Re = V D / ν > ~2000,
 With relative roughness ε / D < 10−6, fD declines in value with increasing Re in an approximate power law, with one order of magnitude change in fD over four orders of magnitude in Re. This is called the "smooth pipe" regime, where the flow is turbulent but not sensitive to the roughness features of the pipe (because the vortices are much larger than those features). 
 At higher roughness, with increasing Reynolds number Re, fD climbs from its smooth pipe value, approaching an asymptote that itself varies logarithmically with the relative roughness ε / D; this regime is called "rough pipe" flow. 
 The point of departure from smooth flow occurs at a Reynolds number roughly inversely proportional to the value of the relative roughness: the higher the relative roughness, the lower the Re of departure. The range of Re and ε / D between smooth pipe flow and rough pipe flow is labeled "transitional". In this region, the measurements of Nikuradse show a decline in the value of fD with Re, before approaching its asymptotic value from below, although Moody chose not to follow those data in his chart, which is based on the Colebrook–White equation.
 At values of 2000 < Re < 4000, there is a critical zone of flow, a transition from laminar to turbulence, where the value of fD increases from its laminar value of 64 / Re to its smooth pipe value. In this regime, the fluid flow is found to be unstable, with vortices appearing and disappearing within the flow over time.
 The entire dependence of fD on the pipe diameter D is subsumed into the Reynolds number Re and the relative roughness ε / D, likewise the entire dependence on fluid properties density ρ and viscosity μ is subsumed into the Reynolds number Re. This is called scaling.

The experimentally measured values of fD are fit to reasonable accuracy by the (recursive) Colebrook–White equation, depicted graphically in the Moody chart which plots friction factor fD versus Reynolds number Re for selected values of relative roughness ε / D.

Calculating friction loss for water in a pipe 

In a design problem, one may select pipe for a particular hydraulic slope S based on the candidate pipe's diameter D and its roughness ε. 
With these quantities as inputs, the friction factor fD can be expressed in closed form in the Colebrook–White equation or other fitting function, and the flow volume Q and flow velocity V can be calculated therefrom.

In the case of water (ρ = 1 g/cc, μ = 1 g/m/s) flowing through a 12-inch (300 mm) Schedule-40 PVC pipe (ε = 0.0015 mm, D = 11.938 in.), a hydraulic slope S = 0.01 (1%)  is reached at a flow rate Q = 157 lps (liters per second), or at a velocity V = 2.17 m/s (meters per second). 
The following table gives Reynolds number Re, Darcy friction factor fD, flow rate Q, and velocity V such that hydraulic slope S = hf / L = 0.01, for a variety of nominal pipe (NPS) sizes. 

Note that the cited sources recommend that flow velocity be kept below 5 feet / second (~1.5 m/s).

Also note that the given fD in this table is actually a quantity adopted by the NFPA and the industry, known as C, which has the imperial units psi/(100 gpm2ft) and can be calculated using the following relation:
 

Calculating friction loss for air in a duct 

Friction loss takes place as a gas, say air, flows through duct work.
The difference in the character of the flow from the case of water in a pipe stems from the differing Reynolds number Re and the roughness of the duct.

The friction loss is customarily given as pressure loss for a given duct length, Δp / L, in units of (US) inches of water for 100 feet or (SI) kg / m2 / s2.

For specific choices of duct material, and assuming air at standard temperature and pressure (STP), standard charts can be used to calculate the expected friction loss. The chart exhibited in this section can be used to graphically determine the required diameter of duct to be installed in an application where the volume of flow is determined and where the goal is to keep the pressure loss per unit length of duct S below some target value in all portions of the system under study. First, select the desired pressure loss Δp / L, say 1 kg / m2 / s2 (0.12 in H2O per 100 ft) on the vertical axis (ordinate). Next scan horizontally to the needed flow volume Q, say 1 m3 / s (2000 cfm): the choice of duct with diameter D = 0.5 m (20 in.) will result in a pressure loss rate Δp / L less than the target value. Note in passing that selecting a duct with diameter D = 0.6 m (24 in.) will result in a loss Δp / L of 0.02 kg / m2 / s2 (0.02 in H2O per 100 ft), illustrating the great gains in blower efficiency to be achieved by using modestly larger ducts.

The following table gives flow rate Q such that friction loss per unit length Δp / L (SI kg / m2 / s2) is  0.082, 0.245, and 0.816, respectively, for a variety of nominal duct sizes. The three values chosen for friction loss correspond to, in US units inch water column per 100 feet, 0.01, .03, and 0.1. Note that, in approximation, for a given value of flow volume, a step up in duct size (say from 100mm to 120mm) will reduce the friction loss by a factor of 3. 

Note that, for the chart and table presented here, flow is in the turbulent, smooth pipe domain, with R* < 5 in all cases.

Notes

Further reading
  
  Cited by Moody, L. F. (1944) 
 
 
 
  Cited by Moody, L. F. (1944) 
  Exhibits Nikuradse data.
  Large amounts of field data on commercial pipes. The Colebrook–White equation was found inadequate over a wide range of flow conditions.
 
  Shows friction factor in the smooth flow region for 1 < Re < 108 from two very different measurements.

References

External links
 Pipe pressure drop calculator for single phase flows.
 Pipe pressure drop calculator for two phase flows.
 Open source pipe pressure drop calculator.

Friction
Fluid dynamics
Fluid mechanics
Mechanical engineering
Piping